Caloptilia strictella is a moth of the family Gracillariidae. It is known from Manitoba and Québec in Canada and Maine in the United States.

References

strictella
Moths described in 1864
Moths of North America